In J. R. R. Tolkien's fictional legendarium, Beleriand was a region in northwestern Middle-earth during the First Age. Events in Beleriand are described chiefly in his work The Silmarillion, which tells the story of the early ages of Middle-earth in a style similar to the epic hero tales of Nordic literature, with a pervasive sense of doom over the character's actions. Beleriand also appears in the works The Book of Lost Tales, The Children of Húrin, and in the epic poems of The Lays of Beleriand.

Tolkien tried many names for the region in his early writings, among them Broceliand, the name of an enchanted forest in medieval romance, and Ingolondë, a play on "England" when he hoped to create a mythology for England rooted in the region. The scholar Gergely Nagy has found possible signs of the structure and style of Beleriand's poetry in the prose of The Silmarillion.

Fictional history 

Events in Beleriand are described chiefly in the second half of the Quenta Silmarillion, which tells the story of the early ages of Middle-earth in a style similar to the epic hero tales of Norse mythology. Beleriand also appears in the works The Book of Lost Tales, The Children of Húrin, and in the epic poems of The Lays of Beleriand.

The land is occupied by Teleri Elves of King Thingol from the east, who found the city of Menegroth in the forest realm of Doriath. Other Elves, the Vanyar and Noldor, cross the Belegaer sea to Valinor. The Noldor of Kings Finrod of the realm of Nargothrond and Turgon of Gondolin return, resented by the Teleri. Later, Men arrive from the east, fleeing from an encounter with the satanic Vala Morgoth. Morgoth gathers a great army of Orcs, Balrogs and other monsters in his fortress of Angband beneath the Thangorodrim mountains in the north of Beleriand, and attacks the Elves repeatedly. Despite the threat, Thingol refuses to fight alongside the Noldor. One by one, the realms of Doriath, Nargothrond, and Gondolin all fall to assaults, assisted by betrayals and disputes among Elves, Men, and Dwarves. Finally, the Valar of Valinor ask the creator, Eru Ilúvatar, to stop Morgoth. Ilúvatar ends the War of Wrath and the First Age of Middle-earth by destroying Angband and banishing Morgoth. Beleriand's inhabitants flee, and much of Beleriand sinks into the sea. Only a small section of the eastern edge of Beleriand survives, including part of the Ered Luin (Blue Mountain) range and the land of Lindon, which became part of the far northwestern shore of Middle-earth.

Fictional geography 

Beleriand is a region in the far northwest of Middle-earth, bordering the great sea, Belegaer. It is bounded to the north by the Ered Engrin, the Iron Mountains, and to the east by the Ered Luin, the Blue Mountains.

Analysis

Naming 

Beleriand had many different names in Tolkien's early writings, including Broceliand, the name of an enchanted forest in medieval romance, Golodhinand, Noldórinan ("valley of the Noldor"), Geleriand, Bladorinand, Belaurien, Arsiriand, Lassiriand, and Ossiriand (later used for the easternmost part of Beleriand). 

One of Beleriand's early names was Ingolondë, a play on "England", part of Tolkien's long-held but ultimately unsuccessful aim to create what Shippey calls "a mighty patron for his country, a foundation-myth more far-reaching than Hengest and Horsa, one to which he could graft his own stories." Tolkien's aim had been to root his mythology for England in the scraps of names and myths that had survived, and to situate it in a land in the northwest of the continent, by the sea.

A sense of doom 

Shippey writes that the Quenta Silmarillion has a tightly-woven plot, each part leading ultimately to tragedy. There are three Hidden Elvish Kingdoms in Beleriand, founded by relatives, and they are each betrayed and destroyed. The Kingdoms are each penetrated by a mortal Man, again all related to each other; and the sense of doom, which Shippey glosses as "future disaster", hangs heavy over all of the characters in the tale.

Shippey writes that the human race seen in Beleriand in the First Age did not "originate 'on stage' in Beleriand, but drifts into it, already sundered in speech, from the East [the main part of Middle-earth]. There something terrible has happened to them of which they will not speak: 'A darkness lies behind us... and we have turned our backs upon it'". He comments that the reader is free to assume that the Satanic Morgoth has carried out the Biblical serpent's temptation of Adam and Eve, and that "the incoming Edain and Easterlings are all descendants of Adam flying from Eden and subject to the curse of Babel."

"Lost" poetry 

The Tolkien scholar Gergely Nagy writes that Tolkien did not explicitly embed samples of Beleriand's poetry in his prose, as he had done with his many poems in The Lord of the Rings. Instead, he wrote the prose of The Silmarillion in such a way as to hint repeatedly at the style of its "lost" poetry. Nagy notes David Bratman's description of the book as containing prose styles that he classifies as "the Annalistic, [the] Antique, and the Appendical". The implication of the range of styles is that The Silmarillion is meant to represent, in Christopher Tolkien's words, "a compilation, a compendious narrative, made long afterwards from sources of great diversity (poems, and annals, and oral tales)". Nagy infers from verse-like fragments of text in The Silmarillion that the poetry of Beleriand used alliteration, rhyme, and rhythm including possibly iambics.

This applies to the Ainulindalë, Tolkien's account of the godlike Ainur:

It applies, too, to the narrative of Elves and Men in the Beleriand landscape, in the Quenta Silmarillion:

In a few places, it is possible to relate the adapted verse in the prose to actual verse in Tolkien's legendarium. This can be done, for instance, in parts of the story of Túrin. Here, he realizes he has just killed his friend Beleg:

References

Primary 
This list identifies each item's location in Tolkien's writings.

Secondary

Bibliography

External links 

 Parma Endorion: Essays on Middle-earth (3rd edition) by Michael Martinez
 Maps Of Middle-earth by Douglas Eckhart

Fictional elements introduced in 1977
Middle-earth realms

de:Regionen und Orte in Tolkiens Welt#Beleriand
simple:Middle-earth locations#Beleriand